Bulwer is a small locality in Waihinau Bay in the outer Pelorus Sound / Te Hoiere, New Zealand. It can be reached by 77 km of winding, mostly unsealed, road from Rai Valley. A weekly mail boat service delivers mail and also offers passenger services.

The area surrounding Bulwer features a mixture of native bush, farm land and pine plantations.

Naming 
"Bulwer" and the associated name "Lytton Water"
honour either Edward Bulwer-Lytton (1803-1873) or his son Edward Robert Lytton Bulwer-Lytton, 1st Earl of Lytton (1831-1891).

References

Populated places in the Marlborough Region
Populated places in the Marlborough Sounds